Dakota 308 is a 1951 French crime film directed by Jacques Daniel-Norman and starring Suzy Carrier, Jean Pâqui and Louis Seigner. The film's sets were designed by the art director Lucien Carré.

Synopsis
The plot concerns a Dakota carrying a shipment of gold to Brazzaville.

Cast
 Suzy Carrier as Clara Sanders  
 Jean Pâqui as André Villeneuve  
 Louis Seigner as Le commissaire Jaillot  
 Roland Toutain as Le pilote 
 Marcel Alba 
 Paul Amiot as L'inspecteur Joly  
 Michel Ardan as Le chauffeur  
 Antonin Berval as Le commissaire Baron  
 André Burgère as Le directeur du camp  
 Robert Burnier as Charpentier  
 Al Cabrol as Le timonnier  
 Jacques Charon as Lord Vernon  
 Jean Daurand as Le radio  
 Charles Dechamps as Le directeur de la banque  
 Charlotte Ecard as L'infirmière  
 Jim Gérald as Van der Edern  
 Ketty Kerviel as Lady Vernon  
 Julien Maffre as Inspecteur Servais  
 Marcel Meral as L'huissier  
 Jean Nosserot as Le navigateur  
 Palau as Violette

References

Bibliography 
 Philippe Rège. Encyclopedia of French Film Directors, Volume 1. Scarecrow Press, 2009.

External links 
 

1951 crime films
French crime films
1951 films
1950s French-language films
Films directed by Jacques Daniel-Norman
French black-and-white films
1950s French films